Ulomorpha is a genus of crane fly in the family Limoniidae.

Distribution
Canada, United States, North Korea & Japan.

Species
U. aridela Alexander, 1927
U. nigricolor Alexander, 1924
U. nigrodorsalis Alexander, 1949
U. nigronitida Alexander, 1920
U. pilosella (Osten Sacken, 1860)
U. polytricha Alexander, 1930
U. quinquecellula Alexander, 1920
U. rogersella Alexander, 1929
U. sierricola Alexander, 1918
U. vanduzeei Alexander, 1920

References

Limoniidae
Diptera of Asia
Diptera of North America